The Rolls-Royce Sweptail is a one-off large luxury car made by Rolls-Royce Motor Cars.

Overview 
The Sweptail is based on the Rolls-Royce Phantom Coupé and hand-built over four years. Inspired by coachbuilding of the 1920s and 1930s, the car was commissioned in 2013, by a super-yacht and aircraft specialist.

At the time of its May 2017 debut at the yearly Concorso d'Eleganza Villa d'Este, it was the most expensive new automobile in the world, costing around £10 million.

The Sweptail is owned by Hong Kong-based customer Sam Li, son of billionaire real estate mogul Samuel Tak Lee. 

Giles Taylor, former director of design at Rolls-Royce Motor Cars described the vehicle as "the automotive equivalent of Haute couture".

In 2019, it was overtaken as the most expensive new car by the Bugatti La Voiture Noire which sold for US$18.7 million.

Gallery

References

2010s cars
Luxury vehicles
Rolls-Royce Motor Cars vehicles
Rear-wheel-drive vehicles